The 2015 Ukrainian Super Cup became the twelfth edition of Ukrainian Super Cup, an annual football match contested by the winners of the previous season's Ukrainian Top League and Ukrainian Cup competitions.

The match was played at the Chornomorets Stadium, Odesa, on 14 July 2015 and contested by league and cup winner Dynamo Kyiv and league runner-up Shakhtar Donetsk. Shakhtar won it 2–0.

After ejection of Oleksandr Shovkovskyi on 90th minute, his post took over by defender Aleksandar Dragović.

Match

Details

2015
2015–16 in Ukrainian football
FC Dynamo Kyiv matches
FC Shakhtar Donetsk matches
Sport in Odesa